Christ College, Brecon, is a co-educational, boarding and day independent school, located in the cathedral and market town of Brecon in mid-Wales. It currently caters for pupils aged 7–18 years.

History 
Christ College was founded by Royal Charter in 1541 by King Henry VIII. The school still uses the medieval chapel and halls of the Dominican Priory dissolved by Henry.

The school has been ranked in the top three of UK independent schools in terms of "value for money" by the Financial Times newspaper. In December 2017, Estyn (HM's Inspectorate for Education & Training in Wales) assessed Christ College's performance as "excellent" across all five inspection areas – the highest grade that can be awarded. In 2017, 96% of GCSE grades were A*-C and 100% of the pupils achieved 5 or more GCSEs at Grade C. At A-Levels, the overall pass rate (A*-E grades) was at 98% and 83% of results were at A*-C.

Houses 
There are seven houses in the school. There are: two senior boys' boarding houses, Orchard and School; two senior girls' boarding houses, de Winton and Donaldson's; a mixed day house, St David's; and Alway House, for boys and girls aged 11–13. In September 2014, St Nicholas House opened for boys and girls aged 7–11.

Cricket ground
The first recorded match held on the college cricket ground was in 1888, when the college played Llandovery College. During the West Indies 1991 tour of England the ground was used to host a limited overs match against Wales, Brian Lara scoring 82. In use for the entire 20th century, the ground was used by Glamorgan for a List A cricket match against the touring Zimbabweans. The Glamorgan Second XI used the college ground for Second Eleven Trophy matches, firstly in 1996 when they played the Somerset Second XI and secondly in 1997 when they played the Hampshire Second XI.

Old Breconians 

 Robert Ackerman – rugby player
 Dick Atkin – lawyer and judge
 William Aubrey – Regius Professor of Civil Law, Oxford
 Collin Bowen – archaeologist and landscape historian
 Andrew Davies SHR – Cricketer
 Bill Evans – rugby player
 Simon Hughes – former MP for North Southwark and Bermondsey, former Deputy Leader of the Liberal Democrats
 James Dickson Innes – painter
 Arthur Harding – rugby player
 Henry Lewis James – theologian
 Hubert Rees – actor
 Jack Jones – rugby player
 Maurice Jones – priest and bard
 Thomas Jones – artist
 Thomas Babington Jones – cricketer
 Andrew Lewis (rugby player)
 Willie Llewellyn – rugby player
 Kieran Marmion – rugby player
 Teddy Morgan – rugby player
 Thomas Morgan – Navy chaplain
 Jamie Owen – Presenter for the BBC Wales Today news programme
 Matt Powell – rugby player
 David Price – Orientalist
 Thomas Price (Carnhuanawc) - historian and Welsh language advocate
 Brinley Rees – Classical scholar
 Paul Silk – Parliamentary clerk
 Peter Watkins – film director
 Lloyd Williams – cricketer
 Roger Williams - former MP

References

External links 

 
 Profile on the ISC website
 Estyn Inspection Reports

Private schools in Powys
Educational institutions established in the 1540s
Brecon
Boarding schools in Wales
Member schools of the Headmasters' and Headmistresses' Conference
Schools with a royal charter
1541 establishments in Wales
Glamorgan County Cricket Club